Sierra Bullones, officially the Municipality of Sierra Bullones, is a third class municipality in the province of Bohol, Philippines. According to the 2020 census, it has a population of 26,095 people.

The town of Sierra Bullones, Bohol celebrates its fiesta on December 8, to honor the town patron the Immaculate Concepcion.

Etymology
The name of town was derived from Spanish words, Sierra which means mountain range and Bulliones, which means bullions (of Gold). During Spanish era, it was said that a number of wealthy Europeans residents buried gold treasures somewhere between the southern barangays of Cantaub and Dusita.

History
On January 5, 1863, Sierra Bullones was created a town both in religious and civil aspect, merging the barangays of Pamacsalan, Dinao (Bicao), Panagsagan (Guadalupe), Busoc (Bugsoc), Danicop, and Catagdaan. These villages were carved out from the towns of Candijay, Talibon, Bilar, Jagna, and Batuanan (Alicia). 

Initially, the seat of government of the town was at sitio Banlasan of barangay Pamaclasan. Banlasan was later renamed Alegria when it became a separate barrio in 1845. Unfortunately, constant flooding from Wahig River pushed the residents to transfer their town center further south at barangay Candagas and converted it as Poblacion. Alegria on the other hand was later called Lungsod Daan which means old town.

On March 1, 1869, barangays of Dinao (Bicao) and Panagsagan (Guadalupe) together with other barrios from nearby Bilar were carved out from the municipality to create the town of Carmen.

On June 21, 1956, barangays of Caluasan, Candelaria, and San Miguel were re-organized and taken from the municipality with other barriors from Carmen, Trinidad, and Ubay to form the town of Dagohoy, through Executive Order No. 184 issued by President Ramon Magsaysay. 

On December 29, 1961, the northern half of the town, consisting of barangays of Aurora, Bagacay, Bagumbayan, Bayong, Buena Suerte, Cagawasan, Catagdaan, Estaca, Ilaud, Lungsod Daan (Poblacion) with sitio Lumbay, Pamacsalan, Rizal (with sitio Del Pilar), and San Carlos carved out from its territories including other barangays from Candijay, Guindulman, and Ubay to form the new municipality of Pilar through the Executive Order No. 460 issued by President Carlos P. Garcia,

Geography

Barangays
Sierra Bullones comprises 22 barangays:

Climate

Demographics

Economy

Gallery

References

External links

 [ Philippine Standard Geographic Code]
Sierra Bullones

Municipalities of Bohol